Komyshuvakha is an urban-type settlement in the Zaporizhzhia Raion (district) of Zaporizhzhia Oblast in southern Ukraine, although it was formerly administered within Orikhiv Raion. Its population was 5,452 in the 2001 Ukrainian Census. Current population: .

Komyshuvakha was first founded in 1770; it was given the status of an urban-type settlement in 1957. It is named after the Komyshuvakha River which flows through the settlement.

References

Urban-type settlements in Zaporizhzhia Raion
Populated places established in 1770
1770 establishments in the Russian Empire
Melitopolsky Uyezd